Senegalese football clubs have participated in African football competitions since 1965 when US Gorée took part in the African Club of Championships Clubs. In total, 20 Senegalese clubs have participated in African  competitions. Among the teams that have participated more than once in African competitions Jeanne d'Arc is the only one with more wins than defeats. The biggest success was the participation of Jeanne d'Arc in the final of the CAF Cup, in 1998.

Appearances in CAF competitions
As of March 2017

African Cup of Champions Clubs/CAF Champions League

African (CAF) Cup Winner's Cup/CAF Confederation Cup

CAF Cup

1US Gorée withdrew primarily due to financial concerns
2The match was finished 2-0 in favour of Djoliba, ASFA refused to play the penalty shootout due to arbitration, they were to be banned from CAF competitions for three years, no ban was put as they participated the following season after winning their second championship title
3Competed as SEIB Diourbel
4Competed as SONACOS
5Competed as CSS Richard-Toll
6Now known as Mbour Petite-Côté
7Competed as Entente Sotrac

References

Senegalese football clubs in international competitions
African football clubs in international competitions